Otterham is a village and a civil parish in north Cornwall, England, United Kingdom.

Otterham Mill, Otterham Down and Otterham Station (see below) are neighbouring settlements to Otterham village; all take the name from the River Ottery which rises in the parish.

The parish is in the Hundred of Lesnewth and Deanery of Trigg Major. It is in the Registration District of Camelford and belongs to the Boscastle group of Anglican parishes. Otterham parish is bounded to the north by St Gennys, to the east by Warbstow, to the south by Davidstow and to the west by St Juliot. The parish is rural with small hamlets and farmsteads spread fairly evenly across it: the population of the parish in the 2001 census was 228.

The church was built in the Norman period but was altered in 1889 when the north transept was demolished.

Otterham Station

Otterham Station is located at the junction of the A39 trunk road and the B3262 minor road. The settlement grew round the site of the former station on the North Cornwall Railway which closed in October 1966.

Hendraburnick Down (1009 ft) is south of Otterham Station and there are a number of Bronze Age barrows (including Tich Barrow) on the Down. The source of the River Camel is also on Hendraburnick Down.

See also

 North Cornwall Railway

References

Further reading
 Maclean, John (1872–79) The Parochial and Family History of the Deanery of Trigg Minor. 3 vols. London: Nichols & Son

External links

Villages in Cornwall
Civil parishes in Cornwall
Bodmin Moor